By the late 11th century, the Shi'a sub-sect of Ismailism (later Nizari Ismailism) had found many adherents in Persia, although the region was occupied by the Sunni Seljuk Empire. The hostile tendencies of the Abbasid–Seljuk order triggered a revolt by Ismailis in Persia under Hassan-i Sabbah.

Due to the increasingly significant socio-economic issues, the decentralization of the Seljuk government leading to inefficient army mobilization, and a unifying factor of religion in the provinces facilitating the swift spread of the revolt, the Seljuks were unable to quickly put down the revolt.

The conflict was characterized by the weaker Nizaris assassinating key opponents and employing impregnable strongholds, and the Seljuks massacring the Ismailis and their sympathizers.

Due to the Seljuks and Nizaris being unable to complete the war quickly, the Nizaris lost their momentum in the war leading to a stalemate on both sides. Combined with the Nizaris confined to heavily defended castles in unfavorable terrain, the Seljuks reluctantly accepted the independence of the revolt.

Sources

The bulk of the sources authored by the Nizaris was lost after the Mongol invasion and during the subsequent Ilkhanate period. Much of what is known about the Nizari history in Persia is based on the hostile Ilkhanate-era history works Tarikh-i Jahangushay (by Ata-Malik Juvayni), Zubdat at-Tawarikh (by Abd Allah ibn Ali al-Kashani), and Jami' al-Tawarikh (by Rashid al-Din Hamadani).

Background

In the tenth century, the Muslim World was dominated by two powers: the Fatimid Caliphate ruled over North Africa and the Levant while the Seljuk Empire controlled Persia. The Fatimids were adherents of Ismailism, a branch of Shia Islam; but the Seljuks were Sunni Muslims.

By the final decades of the imamate (leadership of the Ismaili Muslim community) of the Fatimid caliph al-Mustansir Billah, many people in Seljuk-ruled Persia had converted to the Fatimid doctrine of Ismailism, while the Qarmatian doctrine was declining. Apparently, the Ismailis of Persia had already acknowledged the authority of a single Chief Da'i (missionary) based in a secret headquarters in the Seljuk capital Isfahan. The Chief Da'i in the 1070s was Abd al-Malik ibn Attash, a Fatimid scholar who was respected even among Sunni elites. He led a revolt in 1080 provoked by the increasingly severe Seljuk repressions of the Ismailis.

History

Establishment of the Alamut State

The Ismailis in Persia, and by extension, Da'i Hassan-i Sabbah were already aware of the declining power of the Fatimids. During his nine years of activity in service of the Fatimid da'wah in different parts of Persia, Hassan had evaluated the strengths and the weaknesses of the Seljuk military and government. Taking advantage of his position in service of the Fatimid da'wah in several Seljuk provinces, he took note of the Seljuk administrative and military prowess. After nine years of intelligence operations, Hassan would concentrate his missionary efforts at Daylam, a traditional stronghold for the minority Zaydi Shias which had been already penetrated by the Ismaili da'wa.

By 1087, Hassan had chosen the inaccessible castle of Alamut, located in the remote area of Rudbar in northern Persia, as the base of operations. From Damghan and later Shahriyarkuh, he dispatched several da'is to convert the locals of the settlements in the Alamut valley. These activities were noticed by the Seljuk vizier Nizam al-Mulk, who ordered Abu Muslim, the governor of Rayy, to arrest the da'i. Hassan managed to remain hidden and secretly arrived at Daylam, temporarily settling in Qazvin. He was later appointed as the Fatimid Da'i of Daylam.

From Qazvin Hassan dispatched one further da'i to Alamut. Meanwhile, Ismailis from elsewhere infiltrated and populated the Alamut region. Hassan then moved to Ashkawar, and then Anjirud, gradually getting closer to the castle, and secretly entered the castle itself on the eve of September 4, 1090, living there for a while disguised as a children's teacher. Mahdi, the commandant of the castle, eventually discovered Hassan's identity, but he was powerless since many in the castle, including his guards, were Ismailis or Ismaili converts then. Hassan permitted Mahdi to leave peacefully and then paid him via Muzaffar, a Seljuk ra'is and a secret Ismaili, 3,000 gold dinars for the castle. The seizure of the castle marks the establishment of the Ismaili state in Persia (also called the "Alamut state") and the beginning of the so-called Alamut Period during which the Ismaili mission unfolded as an open revolt against the Sunni authorities.

Expansion in Rudbar and Quhistan

The Ismailis of Alamut quickly began to construct or capture (by conversion or force) new strongholds in Rudbar valley on the bank of the Shahrud river.

Meanwhile, Hassan dispatched Husayn Qa'ini to his homeland, Quhistan (a region southwest of Khurasan), where he was even more successful. The Quhistani people resented the rule of their oppressive Seljuk emir even more, such that the movement spread there not through secret conversion, but an open revolt. Soon the major towns of Tun (modern Ferdows), Tabas, Qa'in, and Zuzan came under Ismaili control. Quhistan became a well-established Ismaili province governed by a local ruler, titled muhtasham, appointed from Alamut.

The areas that had been chosen by the Ismaili leaders (Rudbar, Quhistan, and later Arrajan) had several common advantages: difficult mountainous terrain, dissatisfied population, and a local tradition of Ismaili or at least Shia tendencies. Initially, the Ismailis gained support mostly in rural areas. They also received crucial support from non-Ismailis who sympathized with them merely due to socio-economic or political reasons. Thus, the Ismailis transformed into a formidable and disciplined revolutionary group against the staunchly Sunni Abbasid–Seljuk order that had dominated the Islamic World.

A complex set of religious and political motives was behind the revolt. The anti-Shia policies of the Seljuks, the new pioneers of Sunni Islam (see also Sunni Revival), were not tolerable for the Ismailis. The early widespread Ismaili revolt in Persia was, less conspicuously, an expression of national Persian Muslim sentiment: the Persians, who had been Islamized but not Arabized, were conscious of their distinct identity in the Muslim World and viewed the Seljuk Turks (and their Turkish predecessors Ghaznavids and Qarakhanids which had put an end to the so-called Iranian intermezzo) as foreigners who had invaded their homeland from Central Asia. The Seljuk rule was detested by various social classes. Hassan himself openly resented the Turks. Interestingly, the Ismaili state was the first Muslim entity that adopted Persian as a religious language.

Economic issues further contributed to the widespread revolt. The new Seljuk social order was based on iqta' (allotted land), which subjugated the locals under a Turkic amir and his army that levied heavy taxes. In sharp contrast, the Ismaili state was dedicated to the ideal of social justice.

Early Seljuk Responses

The first bloodshed perpetrated by the Ismailis against the Seljuks was possibly before the capture of Alamut. A group of Ismailis performing joint prayers was arrested in Sawa by the Seljuk police chief and were freed after being questioned. The group later unsuccessfully attempted to convert a muezzin from Sawa who was active in the Seljuk capital Isfahan. Fearing that he would denounce Ismailism, the group murdered the muezzin. The vizier Nizam al-Mulk ordered the execution of the group's leader, Tahir, whose corpse was then dragged through the market. Tahir was a son of a senior preacher who had been lynched by a mob in Kirman for being an Ismaili.

Yurun-Tash, the emir holding the iqta' of Rudbar, quickly began to harass and massacre the Ismailis at the foot of Alamut. The besieged garrison of Alamut was on the verge of defeat and was considering abandoning the castle due to a lack of supplies. However, Hassan claimed that he had received a special message promising good fortune from Imam al-Mustansir Billah himself, persuading the garrison to continue their resistance. The Ismailis eventually emerged victorious when Yurun-Tash died of natural causes. Alamut was nicknamed baldat al-iqbāl (literally "the city of good fortune") after this fortuitous victory.

Campaigns of Sultan Malikshah and Nizam al-Mulk

Sultan Malikshah and his vizier Nizam al-Mulk soon realized the inability of the local emirs to manage the Ismaili rebels. In 1092, they sent two separate armies against Rudbar and Quhistan. The garrison of Alamut consisted of only 70 men with limited supplies when the Seljuk army under emir Arslan-Tash invested the castle. Hassan asked for assistance from the Qazwin-based da'i Dihdar Abu Ali Ardestani. The latter broke the Seljuk line with a force of 300 men and resupplied and reinforced Alamut. A coordinated surprise attack in September or October 1092 by the reinforced garrison and allied locals resulted in a rout of the Seljuk besiegers.

While planning further anti-Ismaili campaigns, Nizam al-Mulk was assassinated on October 14, 1092, in western Persia. The assassination was performed by a fida'i sent by Hassan-i Sabbah, but it was probably at the instigation of Sultan Malikshah and his wife Terken Khatun, who were wary of the all-powerful vizier.

Meanwhile, the Seljuk army against Quhistan, led by emir Qizil-Sarigh and supported by forces from Khorasan and Sistan, was concentrating its efforts on the castle of Darah, a dependency of the major Ismaili castle of Mu'min-Abad. Sultan Malikshah died in November 1092 and the soldiers besieging Darah immediately withdrew because the Seljuk soldiers traditionally owed their allegiance only to the sultan himself. With the deaths of Nizam al-Mulk and Malikshah, all planned actions against the Ismailis were aborted.

Further Ismaili expansion and schism during the Seljuk civil war of 1092–1105

The sudden deaths of Nizam al-Mulk and Malikshah reshaped the political landscape of the Seljuk realm. A decade-long civil war began involving the Seljuk claimants and the semi-independent Seljuk emirs who constantly shifted their allegiances. Barkiyaruq had been proclaimed as the ruler, supported by the relatives of Nizam al-Mulk and the new Abbasid caliph al-Mustazhir. His rivals included his half-brother Muhammad Tapar and Tutush, the governor of Syria. The latter was killed in 1095 in battle. Fighting with Muhammad Tapar, who was backed by Sanjar, was indecisive, however.

Exploiting this political ferment and the power vacuum that developed, the Ismailis consolidated and expanded their positions into many places such as Fars, Arrajan, Kirman, and Iraq, often with temporary help from Seljuk emirs. Filling the power vacuum following diminished authority of a Seljuk sultan in an area became the regular pattern of Nizari territorial expansion during these conflicts. Hassan-i Sabbah made Alamut as impregnable as possible. Assisted by local allies, new fortresses were seized in Rudbar. In 1093, the Ismailis took the Anjirud village and repelled an invading force there. In the same year, a 10,000-strong army consisting mostly of Sunnis of Rayy and commanded by the Hanafi scholar Za'farani was defeated in Taliqan. Soon another raid by the Seljuk emir Anushtagin was also repelled. As a result of these victories, the local chiefs of Daylam gradually shifted their allegiance to the nascent Alamut state. Among these was a certain Rasamuj who held the strategic Lamasar castle near Alamut. He later tried to defect to Anushtagin, but in November 1096 (or 1102, per Juwayni) an Ismaili force under Kiya Buzurg-Ummid, Kiya Abu Ja'far, Kiya Abu Ali, and Kiya Garshasb attacked the castle and captured it. Hassan appointed Buzurg-Ummid as Lamasar's commandant, who expanded it into the largest Ismaili fortress.

In 1094, the Fatimid Caliph-Imam al-Mustansir died and his vizier al-Afdal Shahanshah quickly placed the young al-Musta'li on the Fatimid throne, who was subsequently recognized as the Imam by the Ismailis under the Fatimid influence (i.e. those of Egypt, much of Syria, Yemen, and western India). However, al-Mustansir had originally designated Nizar as his heir. As a result, the Ismailis of the Seljuk territories (i.e. Persia, Iraq, and parts of Syria), now under the authority of Hassan-i Sabbah, severed the already weakened ties with the Fatimid organization in Cairo and effectively established an independent da'wa organization of their own on behalf of the then-inaccessible Nizari Imams. In 1095, Nizar's revolt was crushed in Egypt and he was imprisoned in Cairo. Further revolts by his offspring were also unsuccessful. Apparently, Nizar himself had not designated any successor. Hassan was recognized as the hujja (full-representative) of the then-inaccessible Imam. Rare Nizari coins from Alamut belonging to Hassan and his two successors bear the name of an anonymous descendant of the Nizar.

In 1095, the Seljuk vizier al-Balasani, who was a Twelver Shia, entrusted the Iraqi citadel of Takrit to the officer Kayqubad Daylami, an Ismaili. The citadel, one of the few open Nizari strongholds, remained in their hands for 12 years (al-Balasani was later lynched by the Seljuks). Many new scattered strongholds were also seized, including Ustunawand in Damavand and Mihrin (Mihrnigar), Mansurkuh, and the strategic Girdkuh in Qumis, situated on the Great Khorasan Road. Gerdkuh was acquired and refortified by the Seljuk ra'is Muzaffar, a secret Ismaili convert and lieutenant of emir Habashi, who in turn had acquired the fort in 1096 from Sultan Barkiyaruq. The latter never enjoyed a reputation of being a defender of Sunnis and hence expediently incorporated Ismailis in his forces at times of dire necessity. In 1100, near Girdkuh, 5,000 Ismailis from Quhistan and elsewhere under ra'is Muzaffar fought alongside Habashi and Barkiyaruq against Sanjar; Habashi was killed and Muzaffar later managed to transfer the former's treasure to Girdkuh and, after completing the fortifications, publicly declared himself an Ismaili and transferred the fortress into the Nizari possession in the same year. Abu Hamza, another Ismaili da'i from Arrajan who had been a shoemaker studied in Fatimid Egypt, returned home and seized at least two nearby castles in his small but important 
home province south of Persia.

The Nizari were very successful during the reign of Barkiyaruq, especially after 1096. Besides consolidating their positions and seizing new strongholds, they managed to spread the da'wa into the towns as well as Barkiyaruq's court and army, thereby directly meddling in the Seljuk affairs. Despite assassination attempts against Barkiyaruq himself, the opposing Seljuk factions often blamed him for the assassination (attempt)s against their officers and accused all Barkiyaruq's soldiers of Ismailism.

By 1100, da'i Ahmad ibn Abd al-Malik, the son of the prominent da'i Abd al-Malik ibn Attash, managed to capture the strategic fortress of Shahdiz just outside the Seljuk capital Isfahan. Ahmad reportedly converted 30,000 people in the region and began collecting taxes from several nearby districts. A second fortress, Khanlanjan (Bazi) located south of Isfahan was also seized.

In response to this growing Nizari power, Barkiyaruq reached an agreement with Sanjar in 1101 to exterminate all Nizaris in their subordinate regions, i.e. western Persia and Khurasan, respectively. Barkiyaruq supported massacres of the Nizaris in Isfahan and purged his army by executing suspected Ismaili officers, while the Abbasid caliph al-Mustazhir persecuted suspected Nizaris in Baghdad and killed some of them, as requested by Barkiyaruq. Meanwhile, Sanjar's campaign commanded by emir Bazghash against Quhistan caused much damage to the region. In 1104, another campaign in Quhistan destroyed the city of Tabas and many Nizaris were massacred; however, no stronghold was lost and the Nizaris maintained their overall position; in fact, in 1104–1105, the Nizaris of Turshiz campaigned as far west as Rayy.

The Nizaris expanded into Kirman too, and even won the Seljuk ruler of Kerman, Iranshah ibn Turanshah (1097–1101). Prompted by the local Sunni ulama' (Islamic scholars), the townspeople soon deposed and executed him.

Nizari mission in Syria

Most Ismailis of Syria had originally recognized al-Musta'li as their Imam (see above). However, the vigorous Nizari da'wa soon replaced the doctrine of the declining Fatimids there, particularly in Aleppo and the Jazr region, such that the Syrian Musta'li community was reduced to an insignificant element by 1130. Nevertheless, the Nizari mission in Syria proved to be more challenging than in Persia: their fledgling presence in Aleppo and later Damascus was soon eliminated, and they acquired a cluster of mountain strongholds only after a half-century of continuous efforts. The methods of struggle of the da'is in Syria were the same as those in Persia: acquiring strongholds as bases for activity in the nearby areas, selective elimination of prominent enemies, and temporary alliances with various local factions, including Sunnis and the Crusaders, to reach objectives.

Background

The Nizari activity in Syria began in the early years of the 12th century or a few years earlier in the form of da'is dispatched from Alamut. Tutush I's death in 1095 and Frankish Crusader advances in 1097 caused Syria to become unstable and politically fragmented into several rival states. The decline of the Fatimids after al-Mustansir Billah's death coupled with the aforementioned political confusion of Seljuks and the Crusader threats all urged Sunnis and Shias (including Musta'lis and non-Ismailis such as Druzes and Nusayris) to shift their allegiance to the Nizari state, which boasted its rapid success in Persia.

Rise and fall in Aleppo

The first phase lasted until 1113. The Nizaris under da'i al-Hakim al-Munajjim allied themselves with Ridwan, the emir of Aleppo who was a key political figure in Syria along with his brother Duqaq, the emir of Damascus. The da'i even joined Ridwan's entourage, and the Aleppine Nizaris established a Mission House ( dar al-dawah) in the city, operating under Ridwan's aegis. One of their military actions was the assassination of Janah ad-Dawla, the emir of Hims and a key opponent of Ridwan.

Al-Hakim al-Munajjim died in 1103 and was replaced by the da'i Abu Tahir al-Sa'igh, also sent by Hassan-i Sabbah. Abu Tahir enjoyed an alliance with Ridwan as well and continued using the Nizari base in Aleppo. He attempted to seize strongholds in pro-Ismaili areas, especially the Jabal al-Summaq highlands located between the Orontes River and Aleppo. The authority over the upper Orontes valley was being shared between the assassinated Janah al-Dawlah, the Munqidhites of Shayzar, and Khalaf ibn Mula'ib, the Fatimid governor of Afamiyya (Qal'at al-Mudhiq) who had seized the fortified city from Ridwan. Khalaf was probably a Musta'li that had refused the Nizari alliance. Abu Tahir, with the help of local Nizaris under a certain Abu al-Fath of Sarmin, assassinated Khalaf in February 1106 and acquired the citadel of Qal'at al-Mudhiq by an "ingenious" plan. Tancred, the Frankish regent of Antioch besieged the city, but he was unsuccessful. A few months later in September 1106, he besieged the city again and captured it with the help of Khalaf's brother, Mus'ab. Abu al-Fath was executed, but Abu Tahir ransomed himself and returned to Aleppo.

In 1111, the Nizari forces joined Ridwan as he closed Aleppo's gate to the expeditionary force of Mawdud, the Seljuk atabeg of Mosul, who had come to Syria to fight the Crusaders. However, in his final years, Ridwan retreated from his earlier alliances with the Nizaris due to the determined anti-Nizari campaign of Muhammad Tapar (see below) coupled with the increasing unpopularity of the Nizaris among the Aleppines. Mawdud was assassinated in 1113, but it is uncertain who was actually behind it.

Ridwan died shortly after and his young son and successor Alp Arslan al-Akhras initially supported the Nizaris, even ceding the Balis fortress on the Aleppo–Baghdad road to Abu Tahir. Soon Alp Arslan was turned against the Nizaris by the Seljuk sultan Muhammad Tapar, who had just begun an anti-Nizari campaign, as well as Sa'id ibn Badi', the ra'is of Aleppo and militia (al-ahdath) commander. In the subsequent persecution led by Sa'id, Abu Tahir and many other Nizaris in Aleppo were executed and others dispersed or went underground. An attempt by the regrouped Nizaris of Aleppo and elsewhere to seize the Shayzar castle was defeated by the Munqidhites.

The Nizaris failed to establish a permanent base in Aleppo, but they managed to create contacts and convert many people, especially in the Jabal al-Summaq, the Jazr, and Banu Ulaym's territories between Shayzar and Sarmin.

Rise and fall in Damascus

After the execution of his predecessor Abu Tahir al-Sa'igh and the uprooting of the Nizaris in Aleppo, Bahram al-Da'i was sent by Alamut in an attempt to resurrect the Nizari cause in Syria.

In 1118, Aleppo was captured by Ilghazi, the Artuqid prince of Mardin and Mayyafariqin. The Nizaris of Aleppo demanded Ilghazi cede al-Sharif Castle to them, but Ilghazi had the castle demolished and pretended that the order was given earlier. The demolition was conducted by qadi Ibn al-Khashshab, who had been earlier involved in a massacre of the Nizaris (he was later assassinated by the Nizaris in 1125). In 1124, Ilghazi's nephew Balak Ghazi, the (nominal) governor of Aleppo, arrested Bahram's representative there and expelled the Nizaris.

Bahram focused on Southern Syria as recommended by his supporter, Ilghazi. The da'i resided there in secret and practiced his missionary activities in disguise. Supported by Ilghazi, he managed to obtain the official protection of the Burid ruler Tughtigin, atabeg of Damascus, whose vizier al-Mazadaqani had become a reliable Nizari ally. At this point in 1125, Damascus was under threats of the Frankish Crusaders under Baldwin II of Jerusalem, and Ismailis from Homs and elsewhere had earlier joined Tughtigin's troops and had been noted for their courage in the Battle of Marj al-Saffar against the Franks in 1126. Moreover, Bahram had probably helped in the assassination of Tughtigin's enemy Aqsunqur al-Bursuqi, the governor of Mosul. Therefore, Toghtekin welcomed Bahram and his followers. Al-Mazadaqani persuaded Toghtekin to give a Mission House in Damascus and the frontier stronghold Banias to Bahram, who refortified the stronghold and made it his military base, performing extensive raids from there and possibly capturing more places. By 1128, their activities had become so formidable that "nobody dared to say a word about it openly".

Bahram was killed in 1128 while fighting local hostile tribes in Wadi al-Taym. The Fatimids in Cairo rejoiced after receiving his head.

Bahram was succeeded by Isma'il al-Ajami who kept using Banias and following his predecessor's policies. Tughtigin's successor and son, Taj al-Muluk Buri, initially continued to support the Nizaris, but, in a repetition of the events of 1113 in Aleppo, he suddenly shifted his policy at the right moment, killing al-Mazdaqani and ordering a massacre of all Nizaris, which was conducted by al-ahdath (militia) and the Sunni population. Around 6,000 Nizaris were killed. Buri was instigated by the prefect and the military governor of Damascus. Ismail al-Ajami surrendered Banias to the advancing Franks during their Crusade of 1129 and died in exile among the Franks in 1130. Despite elaborate security measures taken by Buri, he was struck in May 1131 by fida'is from Alamut and died of his wounds a year later. Nevertheless, the Nizari position in Damascus was already lost forever.

Sultan Muhammad Tapar's campaigns

Barkiyaruq died in 1105. Due to this, Muhammad Tapar, along with Sanjar who acted as his eastern viceroy, became the unchallenged Seljuk sultan who reigned the stabilized empire until 1118. Although their expansion had been checked by Barkiyaruq and Sanjar, the Nizaris still held their ground and threatened the Seljuk lands from Syria to eastern Persia, including their capital of Isfahan. Naturally, the new Sultan regarded the war against the Nizaris as an imperative.

Muhammad Tapar launched a series of campaigns against the Nizaris and checked their expansion within two years after his accession. A Seljuk siege against Takrit failed to capture the citadel after several months, but the Nizaris under Kayqubad were also unable to keep it and ceded it to an independent local Twelver Shia Arab ruler, the Mazyadid Sayf al-Dawla Sadaqa. At the same time, Sanjar attacked Quhistan, but the details are unknown.

Muhammad Tapar's main campaign was against Shahdiz which was threatening his capital Isfahan. He eventually captured Shahdiz in 1107 after a dramatic siege involving many negotiations; some of the Ismailis safely withdrew according to an agreement, while a small group kept fighting. Their leader, Da'i Ahmad ibn Abd al-Malik ibn Attash, was captured and executed together with his son. The fortress of Khanlanjan was probably destroyed too, and the Ismaili presence in Isfahan was brought to an end. Muhammad Tapar issued a fathnama (a victory proclamation) after the capture of Shahdiz.

Probably soon after destroying Shadiz, Seljuk forces under Muhammad Tapar's atabeg of Fars, Fakhr al-Dawla Chawli, destroyed the Nizari fortresses in Arrajan in a surprise attack as he pretended to be preparing for an attack against his neighbor Bursuqids. Little is recorded about Nizaris in the area after this event.

In 1106-1109, Muhammad Tapar sent an expeditionary force under his vizier Ahmad ibn Nizam al-Mulk (whose father Nizam al-Mulk and brother Fakhr al-Mulk had been assassinated by the Nizaris), accompanied by emir Chawli, against the Nizari heartland of Rudbar. The campaign devastated the area but failed to capture Alamut, and the Seljuks withdrew. Muhammad Tapar unsuccessfully attempted to receive assistance from the Bavandid ruler Shahriyar IV ibn Qarin.

In 1109, Muhammad Tapar began another campaign against Rudbar. The Seljuks had realized the impregnability of Alamut to a direct assault, so they began a war of attrition by systematically destroying the crops of Rudbar for eight years and engaging in sporadic battles with the Nizaris. In 1117/1118, atabeg Anushtagin Shirgir, the governor of Sawa, took up the Seljuk command and began the sieges of Lamasar on June 4 and Alamut on July 13. The Nizaris were in a difficult position. Hassan-i Sabbah and many others sent their wives and daughters to Girdkuh and elsewhere. The Nizari resistance amazed their adversary, which was being continually reinforced by other emirs. In April 1118, the Seljuk forces were once again on the verge of victory when the news of Muhammad Tapar's death caused them to withdraw. Many Seljuks were killed in the retreat and the Nizaris obtained many supplies and weapons. Apparently, the Seljuk vizier Abu al-Qasim Dargazini, who was allegedly a secret Nizari, procured the new sultan Mahmud II to withdraw the forces of Anushtagin, and turned the Sultan against Anushtagin, who had the latter imprisoned and executed.

Muhammad Tapar's campaign ended as a stalemate. The Seljuks failed to reduce the Nizari strongholds, while the Nizari revolt lost its initial effectiveness.

Unable to repel the concerted Seljuk forces, the Nizaris continued to rely on assassinations of senior Seljuk leaders, such as Ubayd Allah ibn Ali al-Khatibi (qadi of Isfahan and the leader of the anti-Ismaili movement there) in 1108-1109, Sa'id ibn Muhammad ibn Abd al-Rahman (qadi of Nishapur), and other bureaucrats and emirs. Ahmad ibn Nizam al-Mulk, who led the expedition against Alamut, survived an assassination attempt in Baghdad, though he was wounded. In 1116/1117, the Seljuk emir of Maragha, Ahmadil ibn Ibrahim al-Kurdi, was assassinated by the Nizaris in a large assembly in presence of Sultan Muhammad Tapar—a blow to the prestige of the Seljuks.

Stalemate and recognization of the Nizari state

The Nizaris used an opportunity to recover during another destructive civil war among the Seljuks after Sultan Muhammad's death.

For the rest of the Seljuk period, the situation was a stalemate and a tacit mutual acceptance emerged between the Nizaris and the Sunni rulers. The great movement to establish a new millennium in the name of the hidden Imam had been reduced into regional conflicts and border raids, and the Nizari castles had been turned into centers of small local sectarian dynasties. Seljuk campaigns after Sultan Muhammad were mostly half-hearted and indecisive, while the Nizaris lacked the initial strength to repeat successes such as the capture of Shahdiz. The Seljuk sultans did not consider the Nizaris, who were now mostly in remote fortresses, a threat to their interests. The Seljuks even used the Nizaris for their assassinations, or at least used their notoriety for the use of assassination to cover up their own assassinations; such as those of Aqsunqur al-Ahmadili and the Abbasid Caliph al-Mustarshid in 1135, probably by Sultan Mas'ud. The number of the recorded assassinations dwindles after Hassan-i Sabbah's reign. The Nizaris eventually abandoned the tactic of assassination, because political terrorism was considered reprehensible by the common people.

The nature of Nizari–Seljuk relations gradually changed in this period: the ultimate Nizari aims were no longer renounced, but their subversion in inner Seljuk territories was halted and they began to consolidate the remote territories they held instead. Small (semi)-independent Nizari states were established, which participated in local alliances and rivalries.

Sultan Mahmud II and Sultan Sanjar

Muhammad Tapar was succeeded by his son Mahmud II who ruled from 1118 until 1131 over western Persia and (nominally) Iraq, but he faced many claimants. Sanjar, who held Khorasan since 1097, was generally recognized as the head of the Seljuk family. Some Nizari forces joined Sanjar's forces in his invasion of Mahmud II's territories in 1129. The latter was defeated in Sawa and much of northern Persia, including Tabaristan and Qumis, which was penetrated by the Nizaris, came under Sanjar's rule. Mahmud II's brother, Tughril, later rebelled and retook Gilan, Qazwin, and other districts.

The final years of Hassan-i Sabbah were peaceful and were mostly spent in consolidating the Nizari position, including the recapture of strongholds in Rudbar that had been lost in Shirgir's campaign, as well as intensifying the da'wa in Iraq, Adhurbayjan, Gilan, Tabaristan, and Khurasan. These successes, and those of the later decades, are partly attributed to the peaceful or friendly relations of the Nizaris with Sanjar. According to Juwayni, Hassan-i Sabbah sent a eunuch to place a dagger into the ground beside the Sultan's bed once he was asleep. Afterward, Sanjar established good relations with the Nizaris. Several manshurs ("decrees") by Sanjar are recorded to be at the library of Alamut, in which the sultan had conciliated the Nizaris. Sanjar reportedly paid the Nizaris an annual of 3,000-4,000 dinars from taxes of Qumis, as well as allowing them to levy tolls from the caravans passing beneath Girdkuh on the Khurasan Road.

Campaigns against Kiya Buzurg-Ummid

In 1126, two years after Kiya Buzurg-Ummid succeeded Hasan Sabbah as the head of the Alamut state, Sultan Sanjar sent his vizier Mu'in al-Din Ahmad al-Kashi to attack the Nizaris of Quhistan with orders to massacre them and confiscate their properties. The casus belli is uncertain; it may have been motivated by a perceived weakness of the Nizaris after Hassan's death. The campaign ended with limited success. In Quhistan, a Seljuk victory in the village of Tarz (near Bayhaq) and a successful raid on Turaythith has been recorded. In the same year, Sultan Mahmud sent an army led by Shirgir's nephew, Asil, against Rudbar; this campaign was even less successful and was repelled. Another Seljuk campaign launched with local support against Rudbar was also defeated and a Seljuk emir, Tamurtughan, was captured. He was released later as requested by Sanjar. At the same time or shortly after the campaign in Quhistan, the Nizaris lost Arrajan; after this point, little is recorded about them in Arrajan and, consequently, in Khuzestan and Fars also. The Nizaris were quick to take revenge—the commander of the Quhistan's campaign, vizier al-Kashi, was assassinated in March 1127 by two fida'is who had infiltrated into his household.

At the end of Buzurg-Ummid's reign, the Nizaris were stronger than before. Several fortresses (including Mansur) were captured in Taliqan, while several new ones were constructed, including Sa'adatkuh and most famously the major stronghold of Maymun-Diz in Rudbar. In 1129, the Nizaris (presumably of Quhistan) even mobilized an army and raided Sistan.

In May of the same year, Sultan Mahmud moved to make peace by inviting an envoy from Alamut. The envoy, Khwaja Muhammad Nasihi Shahrastani, and his colleague were lynched by a mob in Isfahan after visiting the Sultan. The Sultan apologized but refused Buzurgummid's request to punish the murderers. In response, the Nizaris attacked Qazwin, killing some and taking much booty; when the Qazwinis fought back, the Nizaris assassinated a Turkish emir, resulting in their withdrawal. This conflict marked the beginning of a long-lasting feud between the Qazwinis and the Nizaris of Rudbar. Sultan Mahmud himself also attacked Alamut, but he failed. Another army sent from Iraq against Lamasar also fails to achieve much.

Sultan Mas'ud, Muhammad ibn Buzurg-Ummid, and later lords of Alamut

In 1131, Sultan Mahmud II died and another dynastic struggle erupted. Some of the emirs somehow involved the Abbasid Caliph Al-Mustarshid in the conflicts against Sultan Mas'ud. In 1139 (1135?), Sultan Mas'ud captured the caliph, together with his vizier and several dignitaries, near Hamadan, treated him with respect, and brought him to Maragha. However, while the caliph and his companions were in the royal tentage, he let a large group of Nizaris enter the tent and assassinate Al-Mustarshid and his companions. Rumors arose suggesting the involvement (or deliberate negligence) of Sultan Mas'ud and even Sultan Sanjar (the nominal ruler of the empire). In Alamut, celebrations were held for seven days. The governor of Maragha was also assassinated shortly before the arrival of the caliph. Several other Seljuk elites were also assassinated during the reign of Kiya Buzurg-Ummid in Alamut, including a prefect of Isfahan, a prefect of Tabriz, and a mufti of Qazvin—the list is quite shorter than that of Hassan Sabbah's reign.

Al-Mustarshid's son and successor, al-Rashid, also became involved in the Seljuk dynastic conflicts, and after being deposed by an assembly of Seljuk judges and jurists, and was assassinated by the Nizaris in 5 or 6 June 1138 when he arrived in Isfahan to join his allies. In Alamut, celebrations were held again for the death of a caliph and the first victory for the new Lord of Alamut, Muhammad ibn Buzurg-Ummid. In Isfahan, a great massacre of the Nizaris (or those accused to be Nizaris) was committed. During the reign of Muhammad ibn Buzurg-Ummid, the Seljuk Sultan Da'ud, who had persecuted the Nizaris of Adharbaijan, was assassinated in Tabriz in 1143 by four Syrian fida'is. They were allegedly sent by Zangi, the ruler of Mosul, who feared that the Sultan may depose him. An attack by Sultan Mas'ud against Lamasar and other places in Rudbar was repelled in the same year.

The Nizari influence extended to Georgia (where a local ruler was assassinated) and their territories were expanded into Daylaman and Gilan, where new fortresses, namely Sa'adatkuh, Mubarakkuh, and Firuzkuh were captured chiefly through the efforts of the commander Kiya Muhammad ibn Ali Khusraw Firuz. Nizari operations were often led by Kiya Ali ibn Buzurg-Ummid, brother of Muhammad. They also made efforts to penetrate the empire of Ghur (in present-day Afghanistan).

Other assassinations recorded during Muhammad's reign include an emir of Sultan Sanjar and one of his associates, Yamin al-Dawla Khwarazmshah (a prince of the Khwarazmian dynasty, in 1139/1140), a local ruler in Tabaristan, a vizier, and the qadis of Quhistan (in 1138/1139), Tiflis (in 1138/1139), and Hamadan (in 1139/1140), who had authorized the executions of Nizaris. Nevertheless, the stalemate mostly continued during Muhammad ibn Buzurg-Ummid's reign.

The reduced number of assassinations during Muhammad's reign comes with the fact that the Nizaris were mostly occupied with building fortresses and handling local conflicts with neighboring territories, in particular raiding and counter-raidings between the Nizari heartland and their neighbor Qazwin. Two notable regional enemies of the Nizaris in this period were (1) Shah Ghazi Rustam (after the assassination of his son Girdbazu), the Bawandid ruler of Tabaristan and Gilan and (2) Abbas, the Seljuk governor of Rayy, both of whom are alleged to have built towers made of the skulls of Nizaris they massacred. Abbas was killed on Sultan Mas'ud's order and at Sanjar's request, itself after an entreaty made by a Nizari emissary; this suggests another period of truce between Sanjar and the Nizaris. Elsewhere conflicts are also reported with Sultan Sanjar, for example, the latter's attempt to restore Sunni Islam in a Nizari base in Quhistan: Al-Amid ibn Mansur (Mas'ud?), the governor of Turaythith, had submitted to the Quhistani Nizaris, but his successor Ala al-Din Mahmud appealed to Sanjar for restoring the Sunni rule there. Sanjar's army led by emir Qajaq was defeated. Soon after, another emir of Sanjar, Muhammad ibn Anaz, began to conduct "personal" raids against the Nizaris of Quhistan, probably with Sanjar's approval, until at least 1159, i.e., after Sanjar's death. In Nizari castles, the leadership was often dynastic and hence the nature of most such conflicts is limited to that certain dynasty.

The reigns of Hassan II and his son Muhammad II at Alamut were mostly peaceful, except some raids and the assassination of Adud al-Din Abu al-Faraj Muhammad ibn Abdallah, the prominent vizier of the Abbasid caliph al-Mustadi, in 1177/1178, shortly after the fall of the Fatimids by Saladin six years earlier.

Nizari foothold in Jabal Bahra', Syria

As the Fatimid Caliphate declined soon after the Nizari–Musta'li schism, the bulk of the Ismailis of Syria rallied toward the Nizaris. In this third phase of their activity in Syria from 1130 until 1151, the Nizaris obtained and held several strongholds in the Jabal Bahra' (the Syrian Coastal Mountain Range). Following the Crusaders' failure to capture Jabal Bahra', the Nizaris had quickly reorganized under da'i Abu al-Fath and transferred their activities from the cities to this mountainous region. Little is known about this period of Nizaris in Syria. They obtained their first fortress, al-Qadmus, by purchasing it in 1132–1133 from the governor of al-Kahf Castle, Sayf al-Mulk ibn 'Amrun. Al-Kahf itself was later sold by Sayf al-Mulk's son, Musa, to prevent the castle's fall to his rival cousins. In 1136–1137, the Frankish-occupied Khariba was captured by local Nizaris. In 1140–1141, the Nizaris captured Masyaf by killing Sunqur, who commanded the fort on behalf of the Banu Munqidh of Shayzar. Khawabi, Rusafa, Maniqa, and Qulay'a were captured around the same time. A few decades later, William of Tyre put the number of these castles at ten and the Nizari population there at 60,000.

The Nizari enemies at this point were the local Sunni rulers and the Crusader Latin states of Antioch and Tripoli, and the Turkish governors of Mosul; the latter was in the strategic region between the Nizari centers in Syria and Persia. In 1148, the Zengid emir Nur al-Din Mahmud abolished the Shia forms of prayer in Aleppo, which was considered as an open war against the Ismailis and Shia Aleppines. A year later a Nizari contingent assisted Prince Raymond of Antioch in his campaign against Nur al-Din; both Raymond and the Nizari commander Ali ibn Wafa' were killed in the subsequent battle at Inab in June 1149.

A succession dispute occurred after the death of Shaykh Abu Muhammad, the head of the Nizari da'wa in Syria. Eventually, the leadership was passed to Rashid al-Din Sinan by orders from Alamut. He managed to consolidate the Nizari position in Syria by adopting appropriate policies towards the Crusaders, Nur al-Din, and Saladin.

Aftermath

Hassan-i Sabbah's objective was not realized, but nor was that of the Seljuks who intended to uproot the Nizaris who now formed a stable state of their own. The Nizari-Seljuk military confrontations became a stalemate by around 1120.

The Nizari state gradually weakened due to prolonged conflicts with too many superior enemies. The indecisive Nizari policy against the Mongols also contributed to their fall after the Mongol invasion of Persia. Though the Mongol massacre at Alamut was widely interpreted to be the end of Ismaili influence in the region, modern studies suggest that the Ismailis’ political influence continued. In 674/1275, a son of Rukn al-Din managed to recapture Alamut, though only for a few years. The Nizari Imam, known in the sources as Khudawand Muhammad, again managed to recapture the fort in the fourteenth century. According to Mar’ashi, the Imam’s descendants would remain at Alamut until the late fifteenth century. Ismaili political activity in the region also seems to have continued under the leadership of Sultan Muhammad ibn Jahangir and his son, until the latter’s execution in 1597. Deprived of political power, the Nizaris were scattered in the many lands and lived until the present day as religious minorities.

The Nizari state enjoyed a sort of stability that was uncommon in other principalities of the Muslim World in that period. These are attributed to their distinct methods of struggle, the genius of their early leaders, their strong solidarity, the sense of initiative of their local leaders, their appeal to outstanding individuals, as well as their strong sense of mission and total dedication to their ultimate ideal, which they maintained even after their initial failure against the Seljuks.

Conflicts continued between the Alamut and the people of Qazwin, the rulers of Tabaristan, and after the decline of the Seljuks, the Khwarezmshahs. The Ismailis of Quhistan were engaged against the Ghurids, while those of Syria gradually became independent of Alamut.

Nizari methods

Decentralized strongholds

The struggles of the Ismailis in Persia were characterized by distinctive patterns and methods. Modeled and named after the hijra (emigration) of the Islamic prophet Muhammad from Mecca to Medina, the Nizaris established headquarters called dar al-hijra in Iraq, Bahrayn, Yemen and the Maghreb. These were strongholds serving as defensible places of refuge as well as local headquarters for regional operations. These strongholds of the da'is were independent but cooperated with each other. This coordinated decentralized model of revolt proved to be effective since in the structure of the Seljuk Empire, especially after Malikshah, the authority was locally distributed and the empire was rather in the hands of numerous emirs and commanders (see iqta'); therefore there was no single target to be confronted by a strong army, even if the Ismailis could have mobilized such an army.

The Ismaili fortresses in Rudbar were able to withstand long sieges: in addition to the inaccessibility of the region itself, the fortifications were built on rocky heights and were equipped with large storehouses and elaborate water supply infrastructure.

The Nizaris maintained cells in the cities and bases in remote areas. This strategy facilitated rapid expansion, but also made them vulnerable.

Assassination

The aforementioned structure of the Seljuk Empire as well as the vastly superior Seljuk military also suggested the Nizaris employing targeted assassination to achieve their military and political goals, which they effectively did to disrupt the Seljuk Empire. They later owed their name, Assassin, to this technique, and all the important assassinations in the region were usually attributed to them.

Although many medieval anti-Nizari legends were developed with respect to this technique, little historical information is known regarding the selection and training of the fida'is ( fidā'ī, plural  fidā'iyān) All ordinary Ismailis in Persia, who called each other as "comrade" ( rafīq, plural  rafīqān) were supposedly ready to conduct any task for the Ismaili community. However, in the late Alamut period, the fida'is probably formed a special corps. They had a strong group sentiment and solidarity.

The Nizaris viewed their assassinations, in particular those of the well-guarded, notorious targets which required a sacrificial assassination by a fida'i, as acts of heroism. Rolls of honors containing their names and their victims were kept at Alamut and other fortresses. They saw a humane justification in this method, as the assassination of a single prominent enemy served to save the lives of many other men on the battlefield. The missions were performed publicly as much as possible in order to intimidate other enemies. The assassination of a town's prominent figure often triggered the Sunni population to massacre all (suspected) Ismailis in that town.

References

Nizari Ismaili–Seljuk conflicts
11th-century conflicts
12th-century conflicts
Battles involving the Seljuk Empire
Nizari Ismaili state
Political movements in Asia
Wars involving the Nizari Ismaili state